Kaushik Hossain Taposh (born November 8, 1983) is a Bangladeshi music composer, producer, and musician. He is also serving as the managing director and C.E.O of One More Zero Group & Gaan Bangla TV. He is the creator of music television series Wind of Change. Serving as the managing director and CEO of Gaan Bangla  his platform promotes diversifying all aspects of entertainment under one umbrella so that every artist involved can move forward with swiftness when trailing their creative process. At age 31, Taposh broke another record by becoming the youngest person to be given a Bangladesh National Film Award for Best Music Composer for a film song composition for the film Purno Doirgho Prem Kahini (2013). In 2018, he won the Mother Teresa International Award  on behalf of TM Productions for his 'Wind of Change- Music for Peace' campaign.

Career

At the age of eight, Taposh released his first music album, Pakihder Pathshala (Birds' School) on February 21, 1991, at Ekushey Book Fair. He studied at Bangladesh Institute of Broadcasting art (BIBA). He took singing lessons at Shishu Academy, learned folk music at Chhayanaut.

He created Gaan Bangla, a music streaming television network, in 2013 and introduced top artists through his channel with music videos, refraining from broadcasting any kind of other programs. The channel plays both English and Bangla music.

Taposh is the brain child and the lead composer of 'Wind of Change'  - a multi dimensional musical platform of the world with its headquarters in Bangladesh.

One More Zero Group

The Umbrella Platform of Gaan Bangla, One More Zero Communications Ltd, TM Records & TM Productions publicly renowned as OMZ - the group is the principal banner under which all the mentioned companies operate.

Gaan Bangla

Kaushik Hossain Taposh is the creator of Gaan Bangla  - Launched on December 16 of 2013, the first full HD music channel of Bangladesh, Gaan Bangla

Music videos

Personal life
Taposh is married to Farzana Munny. Together they operate OMZ group. Farzana Munny is a beautician and a fashion designer of Bangladesh. She is also the owner of the women's beauty platform Que-Bella. They have three children.

Notes

References

External links
 

Living people
Bangladeshi film score composers
Best Music Composer National Film Award (Bangladesh) winners
Place of birth missing (living people)
Year of birth uncertain
1983 births